Larry Hoover (born November 30, 1950) is a convicted and former American gang leader. He is the co-founder of the Chicago street gang, the Gangster Disciples.

Hoover is currently serving six life sentences at the ADX Florence prison facility in Colorado. He was previously sentenced to life imprisonment plus 200 years for a 1973 murder, and then, received another life term in 1997 after a 17-year investigation of illegal activities under his watch. The latter of which he was convicted of conspiracy, extortion, money laundering, and running a continuing criminal enterprise from state prison.

Larry Hoover has made multiple attempts to have his sentence shortened.

Early and personal life 
Hoover was born on November 30, 1950 in Jackson, Mississippi. He moved to Chicago, Illinois at the age of four. At the age of 13, Hoover dropped out of junior high and joined a gang called the Supreme Gangsters, when he was involved in petty theft and muggings.

In 1968, Hoover was romantically involved with Winndye Jenkins with whom he shares one of his three children, a son named Larry Hoover, Jr. They were denied marriage by the Illinois Department of Corrections until January 9, 2020, when they were deemed legally married by the U.S. Department of Justice.

Hoover was formerly associated with Gangster Disciple lieutenant, A'Marion Taylor. He also involved himself in fighting cold cases about murders that are only now coming to light, also tied to the organization.

Biography

Gang and impact 
In 1969, Hoover and David Barksdale called a truce and decided to combine both of their respective rival gangs (Supreme Gangsters and Black Disciples) together to become the Black Gangster Disciple Nation (BGDN).

Death of David Barksdale and Disciple takeover 
In 1974, after the leader of the Black Disciples, David Barksdale, died from kidney failure by an injury due to an earlier shooting, Hoover took over the reins of the Black Gangster Disciple Nation. He deemed himself the chairman of the crew. At the time, the Disciples had control of Chicago's South Side turf. Under Hoover's rule, the Black Gangster Disciple Nation took over a majority of the Chicago drug trade. While incarcerated, in 1978, Hoover, formed the Folk Nation, which added all gangs in his personal likeliness and interest to relate to the BDGN such as the Lady, Satan, Maniac Latin, Spanish Gangster Disciples, Ambrose, the Two-Two Boys, Two Sixers, Simon City Royals, North Side Insane Popes, La Raza Nation, Spanish Cobras, Imperial Gangsters, Harrison Gents, and the Latin Eagles. The Folk Nation maintained their ground from within prison property to drug-ruffled streets. While Hoover was incarcerated, he ran the gang's illicit drug trade both in prison and on the streets, starting from Chicago's West Side and later extending throughout the United States. Similarly, certain parts of the affiliated Folk Nation alliance began to expand to parts of the United States including the Midwest of which Chicago is in. As of 2022, the Gangster Disciples has confirmed expansions to Indianapolis, Kansas City, Minneapolis, Detroit, Milwaukee, Birmingham, Cincinnati, Memphis and Hoover's birthplace of Jackson.

The Folk Nation, including that of the Black Gangster Disciple Nation, also personified a rivalry with the People Nation, which included other gangs such as the Almighty Black P. Stone Nation (run by Jeff Fort, who today shares the same prison facility as Hoover and is also a Mississippi-born native), Almighty Vice Lord Nation, Latin Kings, Mickey Cobras, South Side Almighty Insane Popes (the South Side faction were rivals with the Simon City Royals, Satan Disciples and Two Sixers, causing them to splinter themselves from the North Side faction), Almighty Saints and the Four Corner Hustlers. The Gangster Disciples also engaged in a city rivalry with South Memphis crew, the Love Murdering Gangsters (formerly LMG Mafia).

Dispute with the Black Disciples 
In 1989, the Black Gangster Disciples began having leadership problems as they noticed Hoover's leadership of the Folk Nation alliance deteriorated once he shifted his sole focus toward the now-splintered Gangster Disciples. The decline of the BGDN leadership infuriated a majority of its members and resulted in the two gangs separating into the aforementioned Gangster Disciples and the reincarnated Black Disciples. One instance of their split and later animosity was a drug dealing dispute in the Englewood neighborhood of Chicago's South Side, which escalated into a shooting that killed several people. By early 1993, Hoover claimed to have renounced his violent criminal past and became an urban political celebrity in Chicago. Hoover proclaimed that the GD initials had changed to mean "Growth & Development."

As of July 2022, Hoover confirms that he no longer affiliates with the Gangster Disciples and wants "no part" of the gang "whatsoever". He also claims that he was "no longer the Larry Hoover people sometimes talk about, or he who is written about in the papers, or the crime figure described by the government." Many believed it was a ruse for his plan to have his sentence reduced or either way appealed.

Legal history

1973: William Young murder 
On the evening of February 26, 1973, William "Pooky" Young, a 19-year-old neighborhood drug dealer, was abducted and later shot to death in an alley near 68th Street and Union Avenue in Englewood, a neighborhood on the South Side of Chicago. His killing was ordered by Hoover after his name was mentioned as one of three people accused of stealing drugs and money from the gang six days earlier. On March 16, 1973, Hoover—along with Young's killer, Black Disciple member Andrew Howard—were both arrested. In November 1973, Howard and Hoover were both charged with murder and sentenced to life imprisonment plus 200 years in prison. Hoover was sent to Stateville Correctional Center in Crest Hill, Illinois, to serve out his term.

1995: Criminal enterprise conviction 
While in prison for murder, on August 22, 1995, after a 17-year undercover joint investigation by the Illinois Department of Corrections, Federal Bureau of Investigation, Bureau of Alcohol, Tobacco, Firearms and Explosives, Hoover was indicted for conspiracy, extortion, money laundering, drug-related offenses, and continuing to engage in a criminal enterprise.  A lengthy federal investigation using wiretaps led to Hoover getting arrested. Prosecutors alleged that his gang had 30,000 "soldiers" in 35 states and made $100 million a year. He was arrested at the Dixon Correctional Center by federal agents, and moved to the Metropolitan Correctional Center in downtown Chicago to stand trial. In 1997, Hoover was found guilty on all charges. He was sentenced to three additional life terms in federal prison. Hoover is currently serving his sentence at the ADX Florence in Fremont County, Colorado.

Attempts to appeal 
In 2021, Hoover, having hired Bill Cosby's former attorney, Jennifer Bonjean, tried to appeal his sentence under the First Step Act, but was denied by U.S. Judge Harry Leinenweber.

Other endeavors

Book 
In 1996, Hoover's teachings were published on a book titled The Blueprint of a New Concept: From Gangster Disciple to Growth & Development.

The Larry Hoover Project 
In 2014, Hoover's wife, Winndye Jenkins-Hoover created the Larry Hoover Project, aimed to give her husband clemency and have his criminal history reviewed.

Kanye West involvement 
Rap musician and fellow Chicago native, Kanye West has, for over a decade, idealized about wanting Hoover to be released from prison. West has taken significant action towards his goal of releasing Hoover from the jail system. On one of the demo versions of his song "Hurricane", which was meant to appear on his since-scrapped project, Yandhi, West suggested calling his ex-wife, Kim Kardashian, to help release Hoover, following Kardashian's success on working with former U.S. president Donald Trump to free a number of federal prisoners. On October 11, 2018, during a luncheon with Trump, West pleaded for clemency for Hoover.

West's 2021 album, Donda, contains the track, "Jesus Lord", and its remix, "Jesus Lord, Pt. 2", which both feature a recorded message by Hoover's son, Larry, Jr., in which he discusses the "cracks" in America's criminal justice system, and talks about the impact of Hoover's incarceration on his family. Three months later, on December 9, 2021, West, along with fellow rapper Drake, hosted a "Free Larry Hoover" benefit concert at the Los Angeles Memorial Coliseum; it was livestreamed via Amazon Prime Video. Drake's performance and cry for Hoover's clemency was accidentally edited off of the original stream, but was later revised. The main goal of the concert was to bring awareness to Hoover's case; West and Drake called for the release of Hoover and sought to raise awareness about prison and sentencing reform in the United States. Though West and Drake had previously been involved in an ongoing rivalry, they decided to put an end to their feud, and focus on putting their fame and influence to use by bringing awareness to Hoover's case, by organizing the benefit concert.

In popular culture 
Hoover appears via phone from prison on multiple skits of Geto Boys' 1996 album, The Resurrection, where he discusses his views on the prison system and the youth of the black community. By association with the Geto Boys, Rap-A-Lot Records founder J. Prince has shown support for Hoover following his incarceration and as of 2022, is calling for him to be pardoned.

Rapper Rick Ross has mentioned Hoover and Black Mafia Family co-founder Big Meech by names on the chorus of his 2010 Teflon Don single, "B.M.F. (Blowin' Money Fast)": "I think I'm Big Meech, Larry Hoover / Whippin' work, hallelujah".

References

Further reading

External links
 Charges Against 6 Dropped In Illinois Prison Riot Trial, UPI (June 2, 1981)

1950 births
African-American gangsters
American gangsters
American crime bosses
Gang members
Gangsters from Chicago
Inmates of ADX Florence
Living people
Gangsters sentenced to life imprisonment
21st-century African-American people
20th-century African-American people
People from Jackson, Mississippi
Criminals from Mississippi
Criminals from Chicago
American prisoners and detainees
American people convicted of murder
American people convicted of drug offenses